The 1948 Summer Olympics (officially the Games of the XIV Olympiad and also known as London 1948) were an international multi-sport event held from 29 July to 14 August 1948 in London, United Kingdom. Following a twelve-year hiatus caused by the outbreak of World War II, these were the first Summer Olympics held since the 1936 Games in Berlin. The 1940 Olympic Games had been scheduled for Tokyo and then for Helsinki, while the 1944 Olympic Games had been provisionally planned for London. This was the second time London had hosted the Olympic Games, having previously hosted them in 1908, forty years earlier. The Olympics would again return to London 64 years later in 2012, making London the first city to have hosted the games three times, and the only such city until Paris and Los Angeles host their third games in 2024 and 2028, respectively. The 1948 Olympic Games were also the first of two summer Games held under the IOC presidency of Sigfrid Edström.

The 1948 Olympics came to be known as the "Austerity Games" due to the difficult economic climate and rationing imposed in the aftermath of World War II. No new venues were built for the games (with events taking place mainly at Wembley Stadium, also known as Empire Stadium, and the Empire Pool at Wembley Park), and athletes were housed in existing accommodation at the Wembley area instead of an Olympic Village, as were the 1936 Games and the subsequent 1952 Games in Helsinki. A record 59 nations were represented by 4,104 athletes, 3,714 men, and 390 women in 19 sport disciplines. Germany and Japan were not invited to participate in the games; the Soviet Union was invited but chose not to send any athletes, sending observers instead to prepare for the 1952 Olympics.

One of the star performers at the 1948 Games was Dutch sprinter Fanny Blankers-Koen. Dubbed the "Flying Housewife", the thirty-year-old mother of two won four gold medals in athletics. In the decathlon, Bob Mathias of the United States became the youngest male ever to win an Olympic track and field gold medal at the age of seventeen. The most individual medals were won by Veikko Huhtanen of Finland, who took three golds, a silver and a bronze in men's gymnastics. The United States won the most gold and overall medals, having 300 athletes compared to the United Kingdom's 404. France fielded the second largest team, with 316 athletes and finished third in the medal standings. The host nation ended up twelfth.

Election as host city

In June 1939, the International Olympic Committee (IOC) awarded the 1944 Olympic Summer Games to London, ahead of Rome, Detroit, Budapest, Lausanne, Helsinki, Montreal and Athens. World War II stopped the plans and the Games were cancelled so London again stood as a candidate for 1948. Great Britain almost handed the 1948 games to the United States due to post-war financial and rationing problems, but King George VI said that this could be the chance to restore Britain from World War II. The official report of the London Olympics shows that there was no case of London being pressed to run the Games against its will. It says:

The Games of 1944 had been allocated to London and so it was that in November 1945, the Chairman of the British Olympic Council, Lord Burghley, went to Stockholm and saw the president of the International Olympic Committee to discuss the question of London being chosen for this great event. As a result, an investigating committee was set up by the British Olympic Council to work out in some detail the possibility of holding the Games. After several meetings they recommended to the council that the Lord Mayor of London should be invited to apply for the allocation of the Games in 1948.

In June 1946 the IOC, through a postal vote, gave the summer Games to London and the winter competition to St Moritz. London was selected ahead of Baltimore, Minneapolis, Lausanne, Los Angeles, and Philadelphia.

London, which had previously hosted the 1908 Summer Olympics, became the second city to host the Olympics twice; Paris hosted the event in 1900 and 1924. London later became the first city to host the Olympics for a third time when the city hosted the 2012 Summer Olympics.

Organisation

Lord Burghley, a gold medal winner at the 1928 Olympics, member of the International Olympic Committee (IOC), and president of the Amateur Athletics Association was named Chairman of the Organising and Executive Committees. The other members of the committees were: Colonel Evan Hunter, General Secretary of the British Olympic Association, and Chief de mission for Great Britain; Lord Aberdare, the other British member of the IOC; Sir Noel Curtis-Bennett;  Alderman H.E. Fern; E.J. Holt; J. Emrys Lloyd, who became the committee's legal advisor; C.B. Cowley of the London Press and Advertising; R.B. Studdert, Managing Director of the Army & Navy Stores; A.E. Porritt, a member of the IOC for New Zealand who resided in London; S.F. Rous, Secretary of The Football Association; and Jack Beresford.

Olympic pictograms were introduced for the first time. There were twenty of them—one for each Olympic sport and three separate pictograms for the arts competition, the opening ceremony and the closing ceremony. They were called "Olympic symbols" and intended for use on tickets. The background of each pictogram resembled an escutcheon. Olympic pictograms appeared again 16 years later, and were used at all subsequent Summer Olympics.

At the time of the Games, food, petrol and building were still subject to the rationing imposed during the war in Britain; because of this the 1948 Olympics came to be known as the "Austerity Games". Athletes were given the same increased rations as dockers and miners, 5,467 calories a day instead of the normal 2,600. Building an Olympic Village was deemed too expensive, and athletes were housed in existing accommodation. Male competitors stayed at RAF camps in Uxbridge and West Drayton, and an Army camp in Richmond Park; female competitors in London colleges. Lord Burghley unfurled the Olympic Flag at the Richmond Park camp at an opening ceremony in July as Minister of Works, Charles Key, declared the camp open.

These were the first games to be held following the death of Pierre de Coubertin, founder of the International Olympic Committee, in 1937. They were also the last to include an arts competition, which took place at the Victoria and Albert Museum.

Opening ceremony

The Games opened on 29 July. Army bands began playing at 2 pm for the 85,000 spectators in Empire Stadium at Wembley Park. The international and national organisers arrived at 2.35 pm and King George VI and Queen Elizabeth, with Queen Mary and other members of the Royal Family, at 2.45 pm. Fifteen minutes later the competitors entered the stadium in a procession that took 50 minutes. The last team was that of the United Kingdom. When it had passed the saluting base, Lord Burghley began his welcome:

Your Majesty: The hour has struck. A visionary dream has today become a glorious reality. At the end of the worldwide struggle in 1945, many institutions and associations were found to have withered and only the strongest had survived. How, many wondered, had the great Olympic Movement prospered?

After welcoming the athletes to two weeks of "keen but friendly rivalry", he said London represented a "warm flame of hope for a better understanding in the world which has burned so low."

At 4 pm, the time shown on Big Ben on the London Games symbol, the King declared the Games open, 2,500 pigeons were set free and the Olympic Flag raised to its  flagpole at the end of the stadium. The Royal Horse Artillery sounded a 21-gun salute and the last runner in the Torch Relay, John Mark , a British track and field sprinter and student at the University of Cambridge with impressive Olympian good looks , ran a lap of the track – created with cinders from the domestic coal fires of Leicester – and climbed the steps to the Olympic cauldron. After saluting the crowd, he turned and lit the flame. After more speeches, Donald Finlay of the British team (given his RAF rank of Wing Commander) took the Olympic Oath on behalf of all competitors. The National Anthem was sung and the massed athletes turned and marched out of the stadium, led by Greece, tailed by Britain.

The 580-page official report concluded:

Thus were launched the Olympic Games of London, under the most happy auspices. The smooth-running Ceremony, which profoundly moved not only all who saw it but also the millions who were listening-in on the radio throughout the world, and the glorious weather in which it took place, combined to give birth to a spirit which was to permeate the whole of the following two weeks of thrilling and intensive sport.

Television coverage
The opening ceremony and over 60 hours of Games coverage was broadcast live on BBC television, which was then officially available only in the London area. However, the BBC's transmissions could be received much further away in the right conditions, and some of the Games was watched by at least one viewer in the Channel Islands. The BBC's official report on the coverage estimated that an average of half a million viewers watched each of their Olympic broadcasts. The BBC paid £1,000 for the broadcasting rights.

Of the live television coverage, only a small section of the opening ceremony broadcast still exists in the archives. However, various filmed reports shot for the BBC's Television Newsreel programme do also still exist.

Sports

The 1948 Summer Olympics featured 136 medal events, covering 23 disciplines in 17 different sports and in arts.

In the list below, the number of events in each discipline is noted in parentheses.

Aquatics

Road (2)
Track (4)

Dressage (2)
Eventing (2)
Show jumping (2)

Freestyle (8)
Greco-Roman (8)

These Games also included Lacrosse as a demonstration sport.

Athletics

Empire Stadium was the venue for 33 athletics events at the Games; 24 for men and nine for women. Of these, four were making their Olympic debut – the men's 10 km walk, and the women's 200 metres, long jump and shot put. A total of 754 athletes from 53 countries participated in athletics. Fanny Blankers-Koen of the Netherlands, a 30-year-old mother of two children nicknamed "The Flying Housewife", won four gold medals, in the 100 metres, 200 metres, 80 metre high hurdles, and 4 x 100 metre relay. As world record holder in the long jump and high jump Blankers-Koen may have been able to win further medals but, at this time, female athletes were limited to three individual events. Duncan White won the first medal of any kind for Sri Lanka (then Ceylon) when he finished second in the 400 metre hurdles. Arthur Wint became the first Jamaican to win an Olympic gold medal, in the men's 400 metres; he also won silver in the men's 800 metres. Audrey Patterson became the first African-American woman to win a  medal, winning bronze in a track and field event. A few days later Alice Coachman became the first woman of color in the world and the first African-American woman to win a gold medal in track and field in the history of the modern Olympics with a jump of 1.68 m (5' 6"). She also was the only American woman to win an athletics gold medal during the 1948 Olympics.

The marathon saw a dramatic finish with the first man to enter the stadium, Etienne Gailly of Belgium, exhausted and nearly unable to run. While he was struggling, Argentinian athlete Delfo Cabrera and Tom Richards of Great Britain passed him, with Cabrera winning the gold medal and Richards obtaining the silver. Gailly managed to recover enough to cross the line for the bronze.

The decathlon was won by 17-year-old Bob Mathias of the United States. He became the youngest ever Olympic gold medallist in athletics and when asked how he would celebrate he replied: "I'll start shaving, I guess."

Arts

Categories: sports-related architecture, literature, music, painting, and sculpture. These Olympics were the last time art competitions were considered Olympic events.

Basketball

Basketball made its second appearance as a medal sport, appearing as an indoor competition for the first time after poor weather disrupted the matches at the 1936 Berlin Games. The event, for men only, was contested by 23 nations split into four pools for the preliminary round; the top two in each pool advanced to the quarterfinals with the other teams entering playoffs for the minor placings. The United States and France reached the final which was won by the Americans 65–21 to claim the gold medal. This was the second of the United States' seven consecutive gold medals in Olympic men's and women's basketball. Brazil defeated Mexico 52–47 to claim bronze.

Boxing

Eight different classifications were contested ranging from flyweight, for boxers weighing less than 51 kg, to heavyweight, for boxers over 80 kg. South Africa, Argentina and Hungary each won two gold medals.

Canoeing

Nine events were contested, eight for men and one for women. This marked the first time that a women's canoeing event had been contested in the Olympics. Sweden won four gold medals (two by Gert Fredriksson) and Czechoslovakia three.

Cycling

Six events were contested – two road bicycle racing events and four track cycling events. No women's cycling events were contested. France won three gold medals and Italy two, while Great Britain captured five medals overall, but none were gold.

Diving

Four diving events were contested, two for men, and two for women. The events are labelled as 3  metre springboard and 10  metre platform by the International Olympic Committee but appeared on the 1948 Official Report as springboard diving and highboard diving, respectively. All four gold medals, and 10 out of 12 awarded in total, were won by the United States. Victoria Manalo Draves, who won both gold medals in the women's events, and Sammy Lee, who took a gold and a bronze in the men's events, became the first Asian Americans to win gold medals at an Olympic Games.

Equestrian

Six gold medals were awarded in equestrian, individual and team dressage, individual and team eventing and individual and team show jumping. Harry Llewellyn and Foxhunter, who would claim a gold medal in Helsinki, won bronze in the team jumping event.

Fencing

Seven events were contested, six for men and one for women. Ilona Elek, who had won the women's foil competition in Berlin, was one of only two competitors to successfully defend an Olympic title in London. Elek's sister, Margit, placed sixth in the same event. Edoardo Mangiarotti won three medals, two silver and a bronze, having previously won a gold medal in the 1936 Games. Throughout his career the Italian won 13 Olympic fencing medals and 27 world championship medals, both of which remain records.

Field hockey

Thirteen nations participated in the field hockey competition. The tournament was ultimately won by India, who defeated Great Britain to claim the country's first gold medal as an independent nation under captain Kishan Lal and Vice-Captain Kunwar Digvijay Singh.

Football

Eighteen teams entered the football competition at these Olympics. Due to the rise of the professional game during the 12 years since the Berlin Olympics the number of talented amateurs for teams to select from was reduced. The gold medal was won by Sweden, who defeated Yugoslavia 3–1 in the final. Denmark defeated hosts Great Britain, managed by Matt Busby of Manchester United, 5–3 to win the bronze medal. In the tournament's 18 matches a total of 102 goals were scored; an average 5.66 goals per match. The joint top scorers with seven goals each were Gunnar Nordahl of Sweden and Denmark's John Hansen. Nordahl and Swedish teammates Gunnar Gren and Nils Liedholm went on to play for A.C. Milan and together were nicknamed Gre-No-Li.

This was the first international football tournament ever to be broadcast on television, with the two semi-finals, the bronze medal match and the final all being shown live in full by the BBC.

Gymnastics

Nine events were contested, eight for men, and one for women. In the men's pommel horse, a tie was declared between three competitors, all Finns, and no medals other than gold were awarded in this event. Finland won six gold medals overall, and Switzerland three.

Lacrosse

Lacrosse was an exhibition sport at these Olympics. An English team composed of players from various universities played a U.S. team represented by Rensselaer Polytechnic Institute at the Empire Stadium.

Modern pentathlon

Only one modern pentathlon event was contested, the five component sports– riding, fencing, shooting, swimming, and running- being held over six days. Scoring was by point-for-place system across the five phases with the winner being the athlete with the lowest combined ranking. The sport's international federation, the Union Internationale de Pentathlon Moderne was founded during the Games, on 3 August 1948. Sweden won two medals in the event; William Grut won the gold, with a final points total of 16, and Gösta Gärdin took bronze. American George Moore won the silver medal.

Rowing

Seven rowing events were contested, all open to men only. Great Britain and the United States each claimed two gold medals. The events were held on the River Thames at Henley, over the same course as the Henley Royal Regatta.

Sailing

The sailing events at the Games took place in Torquay, in the southwest of Great Britain. Five events were contested, with the United States winning four total medals. One of host nation Great Britain's three gold medals at the Games came in the Swallow class from Stewart Morris and David Bond. In the Firefly class Danish sailor Paul Elvstrøm won gold the despite the Danish Olympic Committee having misgivings about sending him to compete as the 18-year-old could speak no English. This was the first of four consecutive Olympics with a gold medal for Elvstrøm.

Shooting

Four events were contested, all open to both men and women, although all medals were won by men. In the 50 metre rifle, prone position, only two points separated the top three competitors. Károly Takács had been a member of the Hungary's world champion pistol shooting team in 1938 when a grenade shattered his right hand – his pistol hand. Takács taught himself to shoot with his left hand and, 10 years after his injury, he won an Olympic gold medal in the rapid-fire pistol event.

Swimming

Eleven events were contested, six for men and five for women. The United States won eight gold medals, including all six men's events, and 15 medals in total.

Water polo

Eighteen nations fielded a team in these games, which were ultimately won by Italy, who were undefeated throughout. The tournament was conducted in a mult-tier bracket, with the best four teams from the group stages participating in a final round-robin bracket. Silver was claimed by Hungary, and bronze by the Netherlands.

Weightlifting

Six events were contested, all for men only. These games marked the addition of the bantamweight class to the Olympic programme, the first change to the programme since 1920. The United States won four gold medals, and eight overall; the remaining two gold medals were claimed by Egypt. Rodney Wilkes won the first medal for Trinidad and Tobago in an Olympic games, winning silver in the featherweight division; the featherweight gold medal was won by Egyptian Mahmoud Fayad, with a new Olympic and World record of 332.5 kg.

Wrestling

Sixteen wrestling events were held, eight Greco-Roman and eight freestyle. All were open to men only. Both categories were dominated by two nations. Turkey was the most successful nation with six gold medals followed by Sweden receiving 5 gold medals. These two teams claimed 24 total medals, in other words half of the total medals given.

Political defection
London was the first Olympics to have a political defection. Marie Provazníková, the 57-year-old Czechoslovakian President of the International Gymnastics Federation, refused to return home, citing "lack of freedom" after the Czechoslovak coup in February led to the country's inclusion in the Soviet Bloc.

Media
For the 1948 Olympics, the Technicolor Corporation devised a bipack colour filming process – dubbed "Technichrome" – whereby hundreds of hours of film documented the events in colour, without having to use expensive and heavy Technicolor cameras.

Slightly over 2,000 journalists attended the 1948 Games.

Venues 

No new venues were built for the Games. A cinder track was laid inside Empire Stadium and all other venues were adapted. For the first time at the Olympics swimming events were held undercover, at the 8000 capacity Empire Pool. As the pool was longer than the standard Olympic length of 50 metres a platform was constructed across the pool which both shortened it and housed officials. In 2010 one of the last remaining venues from the Games, the Herne Hill Velodrome where cycling events were staged, was saved when a new 15-year lease was agreed meaning that repairs could take place. Campaigners and users of the track had feared that it would be forced to close as it was in desperate need of refurbishment.

 Wembley Empire Exhibition Grounds
 Empire Stadium – opening and closing ceremonies, athletics, equestrian (jumping), football finals, field hockey finals
 Empire Pool – boxing, diving, swimming, water polo
 Palace of Engineering – fencing
 Other venues
 Empress Hall, Earl's Court – boxing preliminaries, wrestling, weightlifting, gymnastics
 Harringay Arena, Harringay – basketball & wrestling
 Royal Regatta Course, Henley-on-Thames – canoeing, rowing
 Herne Hill Velodrome, Herne Hill – track cycling
 Windsor Great Park – cycling road race
 Central Stadium, Military Headquarters, Aldershot – equestrian (jumping), modern pentathlon (riding, fencing, swimming)
 Tweseldown Racecourse – equestrian (dressage, eventing)
 Arsenal Stadium, Highbury – football preliminaries
 Selhurst Park – football preliminaries
 Craven Cottage, Fulham – football preliminaries
 Ilford – football preliminaries
 Griffin Park, Brentford – football preliminaries
 Champion Hill, Dulwich – football preliminaries
 Green Pond Road Stadium, Walthamstow – football preliminaries
 White Hart Lane, Tottenham – football preliminaries
 Lyons' Sports Club, Sudbury – field hockey preliminaries
 Guinness Sports Club, Park Royal – field hockey preliminaries
 Polytechnic Sports Ground, Chiswick – field hockey preliminaries
 National Rifle Association Ranges, Bisley – shooting, modern pentathlon (shooting)
 Finchley Lido, Finchley – water polo preliminaries
 English Channel, Torbay – yachting
 Fratton Park, Portsmouth – football preliminaries
 Goldstone Ground, Brighton – football preliminaries
 Royal Military Academy – modern pentathlon (running)

Participating National Olympic Committees
  
A total of 59 nations sent athletes. Fourteen made their first official appearance: British Guiana (now Guyana), Burma (now Myanmar), Ceylon (now Sri Lanka), Iran, Iraq, Jamaica, Korea, Lebanon, Pakistan, Puerto Rico, Singapore, Syria, Trinidad and Tobago, and Venezuela. It was the first time that the Philippines, India and Pakistan competed as fully independent nations at the Olympic Games. Germany, Japan and Bulgaria, under Allied military occupations, were not allowed to send athletes to the games. Due to continuing labour shortages, German prisoners of war were used for the construction of the facilities for the games, in particular Olympic Way. Italy, although originally an Axis power, defected to the Allies in 1943 following Benito Mussolini being deposed, and was allowed to send athletes. The Soviet Union was invited but they chose not to send any athletes, sending observers instead to prepare for the 1952 Olympics.

Number of athletes by National Olympic Committees (by highest to lowest)

Medal count

These are the top ten nations that won medals at the 1948 Summer Games, ranked by number of gold medals won. The host nation was 12th, with 23 medals, including three golds.

See also
 Art competitions at the 1948 Summer Olympics

Gold (2018 film), about the Indian national hockey team at the 1948 Summer Olympics

References

External links

 
Parliament & the 1948 London Olympics - UK Parliament Living Heritage
 
 Exploring 20th century London – 1948 Olympics Objects and photographs from the collections of the Museum of London, London Transport Museum, Jewish Museum and Museum of Croydon.

 
Events at Wembley Stadium
History of the London Borough of Brent
Summer Olympics in London
Olympics Games
Olympic Games
Olympic Games in the United Kingdom
Summer Olympics by year
Olympic Games
Olympic Games
20th century in Middlesex
Olympic Games